Ion Vodă or Ioan Vodă (Romanian for "John the Voivode") may refer to several figures in Romanian history.

People
Ioan I Joldea, Prince of Moldavia in 1552
Ioan Iacob Heraclid, Prince of Moldavia in 1561–1563
John III the Terrible, Prince of Moldavia in 1572–1574
Ioan Potcoavă, Prince of Moldavia in 1577
Iancu Sasul, Prince of Moldavia in 1579–1582
Ioan Ι Mavrocordat, Prince of Moldavia in 1711
John Mavrocordatos, Prince of Moldavia in 1716–1719
Ioan II Mavrocordat, Prince of Moldavia in 1743–1744
Ioan Teodor Callimachi, Prince of Moldavia in 1758–1761
John Caradja, Prince of Wallachia in 1812–1818
Ioan Sturdza, Prince of Moldavia in 1822–1828

Places
a village in Ciutulești, Moldova